The Pleasant Hill Limestone is a geologic formation in Pennsylvania. It preserves fossils dating back to the Cambrian period.

See also

 List of fossiliferous stratigraphic units in Pennsylvania
 Paleontology in Pennsylvania

References
 

Cambrian geology of Pennsylvania
Cambrian southern paleotemperate deposits